Zaminan may refer to:
 Zaminan, Hormozgan
 Zaminan, Sistan and Baluchestan